Port Mansfield Channel or Mansfield Cut is an artificial waterway encompassing the Laguna Madre positioned at the 97th meridian west on the earth's longest barrier island known as Padre Island. During Post–World War II, the tidal inlet was dredged as a private channel differentiating North Padre Island better known as Padre Island National Seashore and South Padre Island. The navigable waterway was channeled during the late 1950s ceremoniously cresting the intertidal zone of the Gulf of Mexico by September 1957 on the Texas Gulf Coast.

The marginal sea inlet was defined by wave-dissipating concrete blocks similarly referred to as tetrapods protracting into the Gulf of Mexico at Padre Island. The breakwater structure was severely dilapidated during the 1957 Atlantic hurricane season with the Bay of Campeche spawning Hurricane Audrey and Tropical Storm Esther engulfing the existing jetty harbor entrance on Padre Island.

In 1962, the United States Army Corps of Engineers devised an expansive coastal engineered jetty system resiliently controlling coastal sediment transport, longshore drift, and shoaling during diverse gravity wave, wind wave, and inimical oceanic fluid dynamics. The granite piers have a divisionary distance of  permitting navigable transit passage from the brackish water of the Laguna Madre to the easterly Gulf of Mexico horizon. The coastal management framework was collaterally conformable given the imminent intervals of low-pressure weather systems and storm surges charged by the gradient intensity of tropical cyclones encroaching the Texas seacoast.

History
Entitlement of Port Mansfield and Gulf Intracoastal Waterway

During the 1940s, the state of Texas and the United States commenced surveying the Laguna Madre-Padre Island coastal basin for a conducive estuary landing seeking to proportion the maritime transport of the Gulf Intracoastal Waterway. The intracoastal waterway and Laguna Madre-Padre Island basin observation determined the anonymous fish camp known as Red Fish Landing to be an adaptable and practical vicinity for a waterfront berth.

In 1949, the 81st United States Congress reached a consensus regarding the Rivers and Harbors Act of 1950 as enacted into law by 33rd President of the United States Harry Truman on May 17, 1950. The Act of Congress authorized the waterfront domain known as Red Fish Landing to be unanimously entitled as Port Mansfield as an honorary acknowledgment of Joseph J. Mansfield. The inland port would serve the public good of the ecotone basin as a water vessel berth for future decades. 

During the 1950s, United States House of Representatives and United States Senate congressional sessions appointed Public works committee hearings furthering the fact-finding with regards to the waterway project of the Laguna Madre-Padre Island basin. The legislative hearings supported congressional oversight concerning the navigability of the Gulf Intracoastal Waterway, Laguna Madre, and the continuation of estuaries of Texas to the Port of Brownsville and South Bay at the Mexico–United States border.

See also
Laguna Atascosa National Wildlife Refuge
Lower Rio Grande Valley National Wildlife Refuge
Mansfield Cut Underwater Archeological District
Texas barrier islands

References

External links
 
 
 
 

Ports and harbors of Texas
Ship canals
Canals in Texas
Bodies of water of the Gulf of Mexico
Transportation in Willacy County, Texas